The Communications Authority of Kenya (CA) is the regulatory authority for the ICT (Information, Communications and Technology) industry in Kenya with responsibilities in telecommunications, e-commerce, broadcasting and postal/courier services. The CA is also responsible for managing the country's numbering and frequency spectrum resources, administering the Universal Service Fund (USF) as well as safeguarding the interests of users of ICT services.

Mandate and purpose

The Communications Authority of Kenya's responsibility entails:	Licensing all systems and services in the communications industry, including; telecommunications, postal, courier and broadcasting.
	Managing the country’s frequency spectrum and numbering resources.
	Facilitating the development of e-commerce.
	Type approving and accepting communications equipment meant for use in the country.
	Protecting consumer rights within the communications environment.
	Managing competition within the sector to ensure a level playing ground for all players.
	Regulating retail and wholesale tariffs for communications services.
	Managing the universal access fund to facilitate access to communications services by all in Kenya.
	Monitoring the activities of licensees to enforce compliance with the license terms and conditions as well as the law.Below are some of the relevant sector regulations: Kenya Information and Communications Act, 1998
 Kenya Information and Communications (Fair Competition and Equality of Treatment) Regulations, 2010
 Kenya Information and Communication (Dispute Resolution) Regulations, 2010
 Kenya Information and Communications (Interconnection and Provision of Fixed Links, Access and Facilities) Regulations, 2010
 Kenya Information and Communication (Tariff) Regulations, 2010
 The Kenya Communications (Broadcasting) Regulations, 2009
 The Kenya Communications Regulations, 2001

History
The 1963 Kenya's independence transformed the colonial laws and policy development towards telecommunications, broadcasting and the media.

In 1997, the first policy guideline specific to telecommunications and postal sector liberalisation was issued based on the Economic Recovery Strategy for Wealth and Employment Creation (2003–2007).  This policy guideline was developed by the Kenya Posts and Telecommunication Corporation (KP&TC) and the Ministry of Transport and Communications. It set out the role of the sector in national development, stated the policy objectives and identified targets as well as strategies to be pursued. The desired market structure for liberalisation was also articulated in the policy. This policy guideline led to the transformation of the telecommunications and postal sector, the creation of the Kenya Communications Act (KCA, 1998) and the Postal Corporation Act (1998).

Prior to 1998, the KP&TC was the sole provider of basic telecommunications services. Telkom Kenya was created in 1999 as a separate legal entity from the previous postal and telecommunications statutory body and is slated for privatisation.

The proliferation of mass media, economic demands and pressure from donors as well as civil society forced the government to review the laws governing the media with a view to liberalising the airwaves, abolishing of restrictive media laws, and harmonization of Kenya Post and Telecommunication Act and Kenya Broadcasting Acts. (Mureithi, 2002)

Initially the government split KP&TC into two entities through the Kenya Communication Bill (1997) and the Postal Corporation Bill (April 1997). However Kenyan government created the telecommunication regulator at the same time that the telecommunications and postal arms of the PTT ministry were spun off as separate operating entities through the Kenya Communications Act of 1998. This move led to the dismantled of KP&TC into the Communications Commission of Kenya, Telkom Kenya Limited and Postal Corporation of Kenya as well as the formation of to serve as the policy advisory arm of the Government on all matters pertaining to the ICT, National Communications Secretariat was also formed.

In 2000, the Ministry of Information, Transport and Communications prepared a cabinet paper on broadcasting with the status of a sector policy statement.  Following that, in 2001 the ministry prepared a draft broadcasting bill and broadcasting policy, however the 2 documents never got approved by parliament.

In 2004 the Ministry of Information and Communications published the draft national ICT policy. It was adopted in 2006 and it aimed at creating an enabled and knowledge-based society by using ICTs to improve the livelihoods of Kenyans.

The liberalisation of the communications sector has had a positive effect on the deployment of communications infrastructure and services in the country. However, the opening up of the sector has not availed communications services to all in Kenya as the licensed commercial operators and service providers have tended to concentrate operations in areas where a return on investment is guaranteed.

The Kenya Information and Communications (Amendment) Act, 2009, established the Universal Service Fund (USF), now administered and managed by the then Communications Commission of Kenya (CCK), the predecessor of the Communications Authority of Kenya (CA). The purpose of the Fund is to support widespread access to ICT services, and promote capacity building and innovation in ICT services in the country.

The sources of the Fund include levies on licensees, appropriations from Government as well as grants and donations. The Fund is expected to finance national projects that have a significant impact on the availability and accessibility of ICTs in rural, remote, and poor urban areas.

In 2010, Kenya ushered in a new dispensation with the promulgation of the new Constitution. To ensure the ICT sector was aligned with the new constitution, the Kenya Information and Communications (Amendment) Act was passed in 2013, leading to the renaming of the Communications Commission of Kenya to the Communications Authority of Kenya (CA). This change also came with the additional mandate of managing the country's cyber security. Subsequently, the Kenya National Computer Incident Response Team (National KE-CIRT) was established as a trusted point of contact for all matters regarding cyber security and collaborating with other players global to mitigate cyber threats.

In 2015, the Authority shepherded the switchover from analog to digital television broadcasting, making Kenya among the first countries in Africa to meet the global deadline of 17 June 2015. This landmark initiative, though riddled with a series of litigation, has fundamentally opened up the world of broadcasting, providing consumers with diverse, rich local content and investors the space to invest in the vibrant broadcasting industry.

The Authority has also overseen other groundbreaking initiatives such as the licensing of Mobile Virtual Network Operators (MVNOs0) in the Kenyan market and the operationalisation of the Universal Service Fund, which is availing communications services to remote and hard-to-reach parts of the country. Other includes a licensing and shared spectrum framework for community networks in Kenya.

In 2019, the CA marked its 20 years of existence, during which tremendous strides have been achieved in the sector.

In 2020, a new National ICT Policy was adopted, with an ambitious focus on embracing the digital economy, e-commerce and other new frontiers in cutting-edge technology. As of 2021, Kenya was undertaking 5G trials, beginning a new journey to exponential future ICT growth.

In April 2022, the Government launched a ten-year Digital Masterplan to chart the country's digital course towards growth and innovation. The National Digital Masterplan 2022 – 2032 is the foundation of the country's digital transformation in the next decade, catalyzing the adoption of digital skills and guiding ICT developments and investments for local and external investors.

The 2022 Government Digital Transformation Agenda (GoDTA) seeks to realize the Digital Superhighway by enhancing universal broadband by laying out 100,000 km of fibre optic cable, digitising at least 80% of government services; setting up twenty-five thousand (25,000) public wifi hotspots; development of eight (8) regional ICT hubs and centres of excellence, enhancement of data protection and cyber security management and catalysing the creative economy, amongst others.

Structure and functions

Board of directors
This is a list of the current board of directors as of December 2022:

•	Ms. Mary Wambui Mungai-Chairperson of the Board.
•	Mr. Ezra Chiloba, Director-General  
•	Dr. Raymond Omolo, Principal Secretary for Internal Security and National Administration
•	Dr. Chris Kiptoo, CBS, Principal Secretary, National Treasury
•	Prof. Edward Kisiangani, Principal Secretary, Broadcasting and Telecommunications
•	Prof. Levi Obonyo
•	Ms. Kentice Tikolo, OGW
•	Ms. Patricia Kimama
•	Ms. Laura Chite
•	Mr. Paul Mureithi 
•	Mr. Jackson Kemboi
•	Mr. Mohammed Noor
•	Ms. Juliana Yiapan, alternate to Principal Secretary, Broadcasting and Telecommunications
•	Mr. Prof. Dulacha Barako, alternate to PS, The National Treasury
•	Mr. Peter Wanjohi, alternate to PS, Ministry of Interior & National Administration

ORGANIZATION STRUCTURE

The Authority is broadly structured into three directorates, namely, Technical Operations and Compliance, Market and Consumer Affairs, and Corporate Services and Administration.

The directorates are headed by Senior Directors who report to the Director General. Under them are 21 departments headed by Directors:

Technical Operations and Compliance Directorate
Departments:

i). Frequency Spectrum Management 
ii). Multimedia Services 
iii). Postal & Telecom Services 
iv). Cyber Security 
v). Compliance & Enforcement vi. 
vi). Monitoring, Inspection & Regional Coordination

Market and Consumer Affairs Directorate
Departments:

i). Competition Management 
ii). Consumer Protection & Advocacy 
iii). Public Education & Awareness 
iv). Standards & Type Approval 
v). Regulatory Affairs

Corporate Services and Administration Directorate
Departments:

i). Finance & Accounts 
ii). Human Resource & Administration 
iii). Information, Communications & Technology 
iv). Corporate Communications

The following departments report directly to the Director General:

i). Universal Service Fund 
ii). Corporation Secretary & Legal Services 
iii). Research, Planning & Quality Management 
iv). Supply Chain Management 
v). Internal Audit & Risk Assurance

REGIONAL OFFICES
The Authority has established four regional offices as part of efforts to take service closer to the people. Nyanza Regional Office-Kisumu
Western Regional Office-Eldoret
Central and Eastern Regional Office-Nyeri
Coast Regional Office-Mombasa
Nyanza Regional Office-Kisumu

https://ca.go.ke/

International affiliations
The Authority is Kenya's designated representative to local, regional and international ICT fora. The Authority coordinates country positions at these fora and also implements international agreements on ICTs locally.
Affiliated International Bodies  International Telecommunication Union (ITU)
 Commonwealth Telecommunications Organization (CTO)
 African Telecommunications Union (ATU)
 Universal Postal Union (UPU)
 Pan African Postal Union (PAPU)
 Association of Regulators of Information and Communication in Eastern Africa (ARICEA)
 African Advanced Level Telecommunications Institute (AFRALTI)

See also 
 List of telecommunications regulatory bodies

References

External links
The CA Website

Communications in Kenya
Government agencies of Kenya
Postal system of Kenya